Samuil Aronovich Lurie (12 May 1942 – 7 August 2015) was a Russian writer and literary historian. Many of his works were published under the pseudonym S Gedroitz.

Biography
Samuil Aronovich Lurie was born in Sverdlovsk to a family of philologists from Saint Petersburg evacuated during World War II. His father, Aron Naumovich Lurie (1913-2003), was a bibliographer, literary historian, Doctor of Philological Science and World War II veteran.

Lurie graduated from Leningrad State University and worked briefly as a village school teacher (1964-1964), then for the National Pushkin Museum in Saint Petersburg (1965-1966). His first publications were in Zvezda magazine (1964). He wrote a column in Zvezda magazine named "Lessons of Belles-Lettres".

In 1966 he became an editor of the magazine Neva. From 1988-2002 he was editor-in-chief of the prose section. From 2002-12 he worked as an editor of Polden XXI Century, a science fantasy almanac. He authored more than a thousand journal articles.

Lurie was the chairperson of the Russian Booker Prize jury (2012). He was awarded the Zvezda magazine Prize (1993, 2003), the Neva magazine Prize (2002), the Peter Vyazemsky Prize (1997), and the I.P. Belkin Prize (2011). He died in Palo Alto, California, United States on 7 August 2015 at the age of 73.

Books
 Литератор Писарев: роман. Л.: Советский писатель, 1987; written 1969, original printing destroyed by security organs
 Толкование судьбы (эссе). СПб.: Борей, 1994
 Разговоры в пользу мёртвых (эссе). СПб.: Urbi, 1997
 Успехи ясновидения. СПб.: Издательство Пушкинского фонда, 2002
 Муравейник. СПб.: Издательство журнала Нева, 2002
 Нечто и взгляд. СПб.: Издательство Пушкинского фонда, 2004
 Письма полумёртвого человека (роман в письмах). СПб.: Янус, 2004 (together with Дм. Циликиным)
 Такой способ понимать. СПб.: Класс, 2007
 Сорок семь ночей. СПб.: Журнал «Звезда», 2008 (under pseudonym С. Гедройц)
 Гиппоцентавр, или Опыты чтения и письма. СПб: Читатель, 2011 (under pseudonym С. Гедройц)
 Железный бульвар. СПб.: Азбука, 2012
 Изломанный аршин. СПб.: Пушкинский фонд, 2012
 Меркуцио, Zvezda 2015

References

External links
Personal site
Magazine publications as Samuil Lurie
Magazine publications as S. Gedroytz

1942 births
2015 deaths
Writers from Yekaterinburg
Russian editors
Russian Jews
Russian journalists
Russian literary historians
Jewish historians
Writers from Saint Petersburg